The 2007 Oyo State gubernatorial election was the 6th gubernatorial election of Oyo State. Held on April 14, 2007, the People's Democratic Party nominee Christopher Alao-Akala won the election, defeating Abiola Ajimobi of the All Nigeria Peoples Party.

Results 
A total of 15 candidates contested in the election. Christopher Alao-Akala from the People's Democratic Party won the election, defeating Abiola Ajimobi from the All Nigeria Peoples Party. Registered voters was 1,793,476.

References 

Oyo State gubernatorial elections
Oyo gubernatorial
April 2007 events in Nigeria